Rayon is a semi-synthetic fiber, made from natural sources of regenerated cellulose, such as wood and related agricultural products. It has the same molecular structure as cellulose. It is also called viscose. Many types and grades of viscose fibers and films exist. Some imitate the feel and texture of natural fibers such as silk, wool, cotton, and linen. The types that resemble silk are often called artificial silk. 

The fibre is used to make textiles for clothing and other purposes. Rayon production involves solubilizing cellulose to allow turning the fibers into required form. Three common ways to solubilize are the cuprammonium process, not in use today, using ammoniacal solutions of copper salts; the viscose process, the most common today, using alkali and carbon disulfide; and the Lyocell process, using amine oxide. The last avoids the neurotoxic carbon disulfide of the viscose process but is also more expensive.

Rayon and its variants

Rayon is produced by dissolving cellulose, then converting this solution back to insoluble fibrous cellulose. Various processes have been developed for this regeneration. The most common methods for creating rayon are the cuprammonium method, the viscose method, and the lyocell process. The first two methods have been practiced for more than a century.

Cuprammonium methods

Swiss chemist Matthias Eduard Schweizer (1818–1860) discovered that cellulose dissolves in tetraaminecopper dihydroxide. Max Fremery and Johann Urban developed a method to produce carbon fibers for use in light bulbs in 1897. Production of cuprammonium rayon for textiles started in 1899 in the Vereinigte Glanzstoff Fabriken AG in Oberbruch near Aachen. Improvement by J. P. Bemberg AG in 1904 made the artificial silk a product comparable to real silk.

Cuprammonium rayon has properties similar to viscose; however, during its production, the cellulose is combined with copper and ammonia (Schweizer's reagent). Due to the detrimental environmental effects of this production method, cuprammonium rayon is no longer being produced in the United States. The process has been described as historic, but cuprammonium rayon is still made by one company in Japan.

Tetraamminecopper(II) sulfate is also used as a solvent.

Viscose method

English chemist Charles Frederick Cross and his collaborators, Edward John Bevan and Clayton Beadle, patented their artificial silk in 1894. They named their material "viscose" because its production involved the intermediacy of a highly viscous solution. The process built on the reaction of cellulose with a strong base, followed by treatment of that solution with carbon disulfide to give a xanthate derivative. The xanthate is then converted back to a cellulose fiber in a subsequent step.

The first commercial viscose rayon was produced by the UK company Courtaulds Fibres in November 1905. Courtaulds formed an American division, American Viscose (later known as Avtex Fibers), to produce their formulation in the United States in 1910. The name "rayon" was adopted in 1924, with "viscose" being used for the viscous organic liquid used to make both rayon and cellophane. In Europe, though, the fabric itself became known as "viscose", which has been ruled an acceptable alternative term for rayon by the US Federal Trade Commission (FTC).

The viscose method can use wood as a source of cellulose, whereas other routes to rayon require lignin-free cellulose as a starting material. The use of woody sources of cellulose makes viscose cheaper, so it was traditionally used on a larger scale than the other methods. On the other hand, the original viscose process generates large amounts of contaminated wastewater. Newer technologies use less water and have improved the quality of the wastewater. Rayon was produced only as a filament fiber until the 1930s when methods were developed to utilize "broken waste rayon" as staple fiber.

Structurally modified viscose
The physical properties of rayon remained unchanged until the development of high-tenacity rayon in the 1940s. Further research and development led to high-wet-modulus rayon (HWM rayon) in the 1950s. Research in the UK was centred on the government-funded British Rayon Research Association.

High-tenacity rayon is another modified version of viscose that has almost twice the strength of HWM. This type of rayon is typically used for industrial purposes such as tire cord.

Industrial applications of rayon emerged around 1935. Substituting cotton fiber in tires and belts, industrial types of rayon developed a totally different set of properties, amongst which tensile strength and elastic modulus were paramount.

Modal is a genericized trademark of Lenzing AG, used for (viscose) rayon which is stretched as it is made, aligning the molecules along the fibers. Two forms are available: "polynosics" and "high wet modulus" (HWM). High-wet-modulus rayon is a modified version of viscose that is stronger when wet. It can be mercerized like cotton. HWM rayons are also known as "polynosic". Polynosic fibers are dimensionally stable and do not shrink or get pulled out of shape when wet like many rayons. They are also wear-resistant and strong while maintaining a soft, silky feel. They are sometimes identified by the trade name Modal. 

Modal is used alone or with other fibers (often cotton or spandex) in clothing and household items like pajamas, underwear, bathrobes, towels, and bedsheets. Modal can be tumble-dried without damage. The fabric has been known to pill less than cotton due to fiber properties and lower surface friction. Modal is made by spinning beech-tree cellulose and is considered a more eco-friendly alternative to cotton, as the production process uses on average 10–20 times less water.

Lyocell method

The lyocell process relies on dissolution of cellulose products in a solvent, N-methyl morpholine N-oxide (NMMO). The lyocell process is not widely used because it is more expensive than the viscose process.

The process starts with cellulose and involves dry jet-wet spinning. It was developed at the now defunct American Enka Company and Courtaulds Fibres. Lenzing's Tencel is an example of a lyocell fiber. Unlike the viscose process, the lycocell process does not use highly toxic carbon sulfide. "Lyocell" has become a genericized trademark, used to refer to the lyocell process for making cellulose fibers.

Related materials
Related materials are not regenerated cellulose, but esters of cellulose.

Nitrocellulose
Nitrocellulose is a derivative of cellulose that is soluble in organic solvents. It is mainly used as an explosive or as a lacquer. Many early plastics, including celluloid, were made from nitrocellulose.

Acetate 
Cellulose acetate shares many traits with viscose rayon and was formerly considered the same textile. However, rayon resists heat, while acetate is prone to melting. Acetate must be laundered with care either by hand-washing or dry cleaning, and acetate garments disintegrate when heated in a tumble dryer. The two fabrics are now required to be listed distinctly on garment labels.

Cellophane 
Cellophane is generally made by the viscose process, but dried into sheets instead of fibers.

Major fiber properties
Rayon is a versatile fiber and is widely claimed to have the same comfort properties as natural fibers, although the drape and slipperiness of rayon textiles are often more like nylon. It can imitate the feel and texture of silk, wool, cotton and linen. The fibers are easily dyed in a wide range of colors. Rayon fabrics are soft, smooth, cool, comfortable, and highly absorbent, but they do not always insulate body heat, making them ideal for use in hot and humid climates, although also making their "hand" (feel) cool and sometimes almost slimy to the touch.

The durability and appearance retention of regular viscose rayons are low, especially when wet; also, rayon has the lowest elastic recovery of any fiber. However, HWM rayon (high-wet-modulus rayon) is much stronger and exhibits higher durability and appearance retention. Recommended care for regular viscose rayon is dry-cleaning only. HWM rayon can be machine-washed.

Regular rayon has lengthwise lines called striations and its cross-section is an indented circular shape. The cross-sections of HWM and cupra rayon are rounder. Filament rayon yarns vary from 80 to 980 filaments per yarn and vary in size from 40 to 5000 denier. Staple fibers range from 1.5 to 15 denier and are mechanically or chemically crimped. Rayon fibers are naturally very bright, but the addition of delustering pigments cuts down on this natural brightness.

Manufacture 

The raw material for viscose is primarily wood pulp (sometimes bamboo pulp), which is chemically converted into a soluble compound. It is then dissolved and forced through a spinneret to produce filaments, which are chemically solidified, resulting in fibers of nearly pure cellulose. Unless the chemicals are handled carefully, workers can be seriously harmed by the carbon disulfide used to manufacture most rayon.

To prepare viscose, pulp is treated with aqueous sodium hydroxide (typically 16–19% by mass) to form "alkali cellulose", which has the approximate formula [C6H9O4−ONa]. This material is allowed to depolymerize to an extent. The rate of depolymerization (ripening or maturing) depends on temperature and is affected by the presence of various inorganic additives, such as metal oxides and hydroxides. Air also affects the ripening process, since oxygen causes depolymerization. The alkali cellulose is then treated with carbon disulfide to form sodium cellulose xanthate:

Rayon fiber is produced from the ripened solutions by treatment with a mineral acid, such as sulfuric acid. In this step, the xanthate groups are hydrolyzed to regenerate cellulose and carbon disulfide:

Aside from regenerated cellulose, acidification gives hydrogen sulfide (H2S), sulfur, and carbon disulfide. The thread made from the regenerated cellulose is washed to remove residual acid. The sulfur is then removed by the addition of sodium sulfide solution, and impurities are oxidized by bleaching with sodium hypochlorite solution or hydrogen peroxide solution.

Production begins with processed cellulose obtained from wood pulp and plant fibers. The cellulose content in the pulp should be around 87–97%.

The steps:
 Immersion: The cellulose is treated with caustic soda.
 Pressing. The treated cellulose is then pressed between rollers to remove excess liquid. 
 The pressed sheets are crumbled or shredded to produce what is known as "white crumb".
 The "white crumb" is aged through exposure to oxygen. This is a depolymerization step and is avoided in the case of polynosics.
 The aged "white crumb" is mixed in vats with carbon disulfide to form the xanthate (see chemical equation above). This step produces "orange-yellow crumb".
 The "yellow crumb" is dissolved in a caustic solution to form viscose. The viscose is set to stand for a period of time, allowing it to "ripen". During this stage the molecular weight of the polymer changes.
 After ripening, the viscose is filtered, degassed, and then extruded through a spinneret into in a bath of sulfuric acid, resulting in the formation of rayon filaments. The acid is used as a regenerating agent. It converts cellulose xanthate back to cellulose. The regeneration step is rapid, which doesn't allow proper orientation of cellulose molecules. So to delay the process of regeneration, zinc sulfate is used in the bath, which converts cellulose xanthate to zinc cellulose xanthate, thus providing time for proper orientation to take place before regeneration.
 Spinning. The spinning of viscose rayon fiber is done using a wet-spinning process. The filaments are allowed to pass through a coagulation bath after extrusion from the spinneret holes. The two-way mass transfer takes place.
 Drawing. The rayon filaments are stretched, in a procedure known as drawing, to straighten out the fibers.
 Washing. The fibers are then washed to remove any residual chemicals from them.
 Cutting. If filament fibers are desired, then the process ends here. The filaments are cut down when producing staple fibers.

Carbon disulfide toxicity
Carbon disulfide is highly toxic. It is well-documented to have seriously harmed the health of rayon workers in developed countries (see history section), and emissions may also harm the health of people living near rayon plants and their livestock. Rates of disability in modern factories (mainly in China, Indonesia, and India) are unknown. This has raised ethical concerns over viscose rayon production. , production facilities located in developing countries generally do not provide environmental or worker safety data.

Most global carbon disulfide emissions come from rayon production, as of 2008. , about 250 g of carbon disulfide is emitted per kilogram of rayon produced.

Control technologies have enabled improved collection of carbon disulfide and reuse of it, resulting in a lower emissions of carbon disulfide. These have not always been implemented in places where it was not legally required and profitable.

Carbon disulfide is volatile and is lost before the rayon gets to the consumer; the rayon itself is basically pure cellulose.

History

Viscoses

French scientist and industrialist Hilaire de Chardonnet (1838–1924), inventor of the first artificial textile fiber, artificial silk, created viscose. British scientists Charles Frederick Cross and Edward John Bevan took out British Patent No. 8,700, "Improvements in Dissolving Cellulose and Allied Compounds" in May, 1892. In 1893, they formed the Viscose Syndicate to grant licences and, in 1896, formed the British Viscoid Co. Ltd. to exploit the process.

Studies from the 1930s show that 30% of American rayon workers suffered severe health effects from carbon disulfide exposure. Courtaulds worked hard to prevent this information being published in Britain.

During the Second World War, political prisoners in Nazi Germany were made to work in appalling conditions at the Phrix rayon factory in Krefeld. Nazis used forced labour to produce rayon across occupied Europe.

In the 1990s, viscose rayon producers faced lawsuits for negligent environmental pollution. Emissions abatement technologies had been consistently used. Carbon-bed recovery, for instance, which reduces emissions by about 90%, was used in Europe, but not in the US, by Courtaulds. Pollution control and worker safety started to become cost-limiting factors in production.

Japan has reduced carbon disulfide emissions per kilogram of viscose rayon produced (by about 16% per year), but in other rayon-producing countries, including China, emissions are uncontrolled. Rayon production is steady or decreasing except in China, where it is increasing, .

Rayon production has largely moved to the developing world, especially China, Indonesia and India. Rates of disability in these factories are unknown, and concerns for worker safety continue.

Lyocell
The development of lyocell was motivated by environmental concerns; researchers sought to manufacture rayon by means less harmful than the viscose method.

The lyocell process was developed in 1972 by a team at the now defunct American Enka fibers facility at Enka, North Carolina. In 2003, the American Association of Textile Chemists and Colorists (AATCC)  awarded Neal E. Franks their Henry E. Millson Award for Invention for lyocell. In 1966–1968, D. L. Johnson of Eastman Kodak Inc. studied NMMO solutions. In the decade 1969 to 1979, American Enka tried unsuccessfully to commercialize the process. The operating name for the fibre inside the Enka organization was "Newcell", and the development was carried through pilot plant scale before the work was stopped. 

The basic process of dissolving cellulose in NMMO was first described in a 1981 patent by Mcorsley for Akzona Incorporated (the holding company of Akzo). In the 1980s the patent was licensed by Akzo to Courtaulds and Lenzing. 

The fibre was developed by Courtaulds Fibres under the brand name "Tencel" in the 1980s. In 1982, a 100kg/week pilot plant was built in Coventry, UK, and production was increased tenfold (to a ton/week) in 1984. In 1988, a 25 ton/week semi-commercial production line opened at the Grimsby, UK, pilot plant.

The process was first commercialized at Courtaulds' rayon factories at Mobile, Alabama (1990), and at the Grimsby plant (1998). In January 1993, the Mobile Tencel plant reached full production levels of 20,000 tons per year, by which time Courtaulds had spent £100 million and 10 years on Tencel development. Tencel revenues for 1993 were estimated as likely to be £50 million. A second plant in Mobile was planned. By 2004, production had quadrupled to 80,000 tons. 

Lenzing began a pilot plant in 1990, and commercial production in 1997, with 12 metric tonnes/year made in a plant in Heiligenkreuz im Lafnitztal, Austria. When an explosion hit the plant in 2003 it was producing 20,000 tonnes/year, and planning to double capacity by the end of the year. In 2004 Lenzing was producing 40,000 tons [sic, probably metric tonnes]. In 1998, Lenzing and Courtaulds reached a patent dispute settlement.

In 1998 Courtaulds was acquired by competitor Akzo Nobel, which combined the Tencel division with other fibre divisions under the Accordis banner, then sold them to private equity firm CVC Partners. In 2000, CVC sold the Tencel division to Lenzing AG, which combined it with their "Lenzing Lyocell" business, but maintained the brand name Tencel. It took over the plants in Mobile and Grimsby, and by 2015 were the largest lyocell producer at 130,000 tonnes/year.

, the lyocell process is not widely used, because it is still more expensive than the viscose process.

Disposal and biodegradability

The biodegradability of various fibers in soil burial and sewage sludge was evaluated by Korean researchers. Rayon was found to be more biodegradable than cotton, and cotton more than acetate. The more water-repellent the rayon-based fabric, the more slowly it will decompose. Silverfish—like the firebrat—can eat rayon, but damage was found to be minor, potentially due to the heavy, slick texture of the tested rayon. Another study states that "artificial silk [...] [was] readily eaten" by the grey silverfish. 

A 2014 ocean survey found that rayon contributed to 56.9% of the total fibers found in deep ocean areas, the rest being polyester, polyamides, acetate and acrylic. A 2016 study found a discrepancy in the ability to identify natural fibers in a marine environment via Fourier transform infrared spectroscopy. Later research of oceanic microfibers instead found cotton being the most frequent match (50% of all fibers), followed by other cellulosic fibers at 29.5% (e.g., rayon/viscose, linen, jute, kenaf, hemp, etc.). Further analysis of the specific contribution of rayon to ocean fibers was not performed due to the difficulty in distinguishing between natural and man-made cellulosic fibers using FTIR spectra.

Sustainable forestry 
For several years, there have been concerns about links between rayon manufacturers and deforestation. As a result of these concerns, FSC and PEFC came on the same platform with CanopyPlanet to focus on these issues. CanopyPlanet subsequently started publishing a yearly Hot Button report, which puts all the man-made cellulosics manufacturers globally on the same scoring platform. The scoring from the 2020 report scores all such manufacturers on a scale of 35, the highest scores having been achieved by Birla Cellulose (33) and Lenzing (30.5).

Producers and brandnames
In 2018, viscose fiber production in the world was approximately 5.8 million tons, and China was the largest producer with about 65% of total global production. Trade names are used within the rayon industry to label the type of rayon in the product. Viscose rayon was first produced in Coventry, England in 1905 by Courtaulds.

Bemberg is a trade name for cupramonium rayon developed by J. P. Bemberg. Bemberg performs much like viscose but has a smaller diameter and comes closest to silk in feel. Bemberg is now only produced in Japan. The fibers are finer than viscose rayon.

Modal and Tencel are widely used forms of rayon produced by Lenzing AG. Tencel, generic name lyocell, is made by a slightly different solvent recovery process, and is considered a different fiber by the US FTC. Tencel lyocell was first produced commercially by Courtaulds' Grimsby plant in England. The process, which dissolves cellulose without a chemical reaction, was developed by Courtaulds Research.

Birla Cellulose is also a volume manufacturer of rayon. They have plants located in India, Indonesia and China.

Accordis was a major manufacturer of cellulose-based fibers and yarns. Production facilities can be found throughout Europe, the U.S. and Brazil.

Visil rayon and HOPE FR are flame retardant forms of viscose that have silica embedded in the fiber during manufacturing.

North American Rayon Corporation of Tennessee produced viscose rayon until its closure in the year 2000.

Indonesia is one of the largest producers of rayon in the world, and Asia Pacific Rayon (APR) of the country has an annual production capacity of 0.24 million tons.

See also

 Cellophane – sheet-extruded viscose rayon
 Hilaire de Chardonnet – inventor of artificial silk
 Nitrocellulose – another form of modified cellulose
 Polyester – another synthetic fiber frequently used for textiles
 Ray P. Dinsmore – pioneered use of Rayon in tires

References

Further reading

Gupta, VB; Kothari, VK and Sengupta, AK eds. (1997) Manufactured Fibre Technology. Chapman & Hall, London. .
 For a review of all rayon production methods and markets see "Regenerated Cellulose Fibres" (book – Edited by C R Woodings) Hardback 2001, Woodhead Publishing Ltd. 
 For a description of the production method at a factory in Germany in World War II, see Agnès Humbert (tr. Barbara Mellor) Résistance: Memoirs of Occupied France, London, Bloomsbury Publishing PLC, 2008  (American title: Resistance: A Frenchwoman's Journal of the War, Bloomsbury, USA, 2008) pp. 152–155
 For a complete set of photographs of the process see "The Story of Rayon" published by Courtaulds Ltd (1948)
 Arnold Hard, the textile journalist, produced two books documenting the experiences of some of the pioneers in the early British rayon industry the Hard, Arnold. H. (1933). The Romance of Rayon. Whittaker & Robinson, Manchester and Hard, Arnold (1944) The Story of Rayon, United Trade Press Ltd, London

External links 

Organic polymers
Cellulose
Synthetic fibers
Products introduced in 1891
Articles containing video clips
Pulp and paper industry